Pedro Tavares Almeida (born 6 March 1994 in Romariz - Santa Maria da Feira) is a Portuguese footballer who plays for Sanjoanense as a defender.

Football career
On 11 December 2013, Tavares made his professional debut with Leixões in a 2013–14 Segunda Liga match against Sporting Covilhã, when he replaced Rui Coentrão (68th minute).

References

External links

Stats and profile at LPFP 

1994 births
Living people
Portuguese footballers
Association football defenders
Liga Portugal 2 players
Leixões S.C. players
Sportspeople from Santa Maria da Feira